Nana Tuffour ( James Kwaku Tuffour, 14 February 1954 – 15 June 2020), also known as 9-9-2-4, was a Ghanaian Highlife singer and songwriter. He is known for popular highlife songs such as Aketekyiwa, Abeiku and Owuo sei fie and had 15 albums to his credit.

Life and career 
Nana Tuffour is a native of Kumasi. He started his musical career with keyboardist Alex Konadu, and joined the Wanto Wazuri Band as a pianist, he later became the lead vocalist for the Waza Africo Band, and also released his first album yes Highlife Romance in 1979. Nana traveled to Nigeria, and worked with King Sunny Adé as his keyboardist.

References

External links
 

Ghanaian highlife musicians
1954 births
2020 deaths
20th-century Ghanaian male singers
21st-century Ghanaian male singers
21st-century Ghanaian singers